Grubbe is a surname. Notable people with the surname include:

Eiler Grubbe (1532–1585), Danish statesman
Emil Grubbe (1875—1960), American radiologist
Evert Grubbe (died after 1492), Danish nobleman
Marie Grubbe (1643–1718), Danish noble
Walter Grubbe (1655–1715), English politician